Perrysburg Township is one of the nineteen townships of Wood County, Ohio, United States.  The 2010 census found 12,512 people in the township.

Geography
Perrysburg Township is located in northern Wood County, surrounding the crossroads of I-75 and the Ohio Turnpike, ten miles south of the City of Toledo, Ohio.  At one time Perrysburg Township was Ohio's largest township, geographically, with 49 square miles; due to annexation the square mileage is now approximately 40.

Perrysburg Township borders the following townships and municipalities:
Rossford - north
Northwood - northeast
Lake Township - east
Troy Township - southeast
Webster Township - south
Middleton Township - southwest
Perrysburg - northwest

Name and history
Established on May 8, 1823, it is the oldest township in Wood County.

It is the only Perrysburg Township statewide.  Perrysburg Township was named after the City of Perrysburg (created in 1816), which in turn was named for Commodore Oliver Hazard Perry, who fought in the War of 1812 and won a decisive victory at the Battle of Lake Erie.

Government
The township is governed by a three-member board of trustees, who are elected in November of odd-numbered years to a four-year term beginning on the following January 1. Two are elected in the year after the presidential election and one is elected in the year before it. There is also an elected township fiscal officer, who serves a four-year term beginning on April 1 of the year after the election, which is held in November of the year before the presidential election. Vacancies in the fiscal officership or on the board of trustees are filled by the remaining trustees.

Current elected officials of Perrysburg Township: 
Gary Britten, Trustee: Term ends December 2017
Hannah Nelson, Fiscal Officer: Appointed June 16, 2021
Joseph Schaller, Trustee: Term ends December 2019
Robert Mack, Trustee: Term ends December 2017

Board of trustees meetings, which are open to the public, are held on the 1st and 3rd Wednesdays at 4:00 p.m. at the Town Hall.

Perrysburg Township offices are composed of the following: Administration, Emergency Medical Services, Fire, Police, Recreation, Road Maintenance, and Zoning.

Education

Primary and secondary education
There are four school districts whose boundaries include parts of Perrysburg Township: 
Eastwood Local Schools
Lake Local Schools
Perrysburg Exempted Village Schools
Rossford Exempted Village Schools
Perrysburg Township is also home to Penta Career Center, a vocational high school, serving five counties and sixteen school districts.

A full-time Islamic school is located on the grounds of the Greater Toledo Islamic Center in Perrysburg Township.

Higher education
Owens Community College

Commerce and industry
Perrysburg Township is home to: 
Ampoint Industrial Park
Cedar Business Park
FCA US LLC (formerly Chrysler) Toledo Machining Plant
FedEx Distribution Center
First Solar Inc.
Walgreens Distribution Center

References

External links
Township website
County website

Townships in Wood County, Ohio
Townships in Ohio